Ava or AVA may refer to:

Places

Asia and Oceania
 Ava Kingdom, in upper Burma from 1364 to 1555
 Inwa, formerly Ava, the capital of Ava Kingdom
 Earl of Ava, a British colonial earldom in Burma
 Ava, Iran, Gilan Province, a village
 Ivah or Ava, an ancient city in Assyria
 Ava Railway Station, in Lower Hutt, New Zealand
 IATA code for Anshun Huangguoshu Airport, China

United States
 Ava, Alabama, an unincorporated community
 Ava, Arkansas, an unincorporated community
 Ava, Illinois, a city
 Ava, Missouri, a city
 Ava, New York, a town
 Ava, Ohio, an unincorporated community
 Ava (building), a highrise in Seattle, Washington

People
 Ava (given name)

People
 Ava (poet) (c. 1060–1127), the first named female writer in any genre in the German language
 Saint Ava, ninth century Roman Catholic saint
 Ava Alice Muriel Astor (1902–1956), American socialite, daughter of Ava Lowle Willing and John Jacob Astor IV
 Ava Barber (born 1954), U.S. country singer
 Ava DuVernay (born 1972), American film director
 Ava Gardner (1922–1990), American actress
 Ava Leigh (born 1985), British reggae singer
 Ava Lowle Willing (1868–1958), American socialite
 Ava Max (born 1994), American singer formerly known as simply Ava
 Ava Ohlgren (born 1988), American collegiate swimmer
 Éabha McMahon Irish singer who performs under the name AVA
 Lee Jung-hyun (born 1980), South Korean singer known as Ava in the United States

Characters
 Ava Benton, on the soap opera All My Children
 Ava Ire, protagonist of the webcomic Ava's Demon
 Ava Jerome, on the soap opera General Hospital
 Ava Ayala, a Marvel Comic character and the fifth character to assume the moniker of White Tiger
 Ava Lord, in Frank Miller's Sin City universe
 Ava Moore, on the FX Network television series Nip/Tuck
 Ava Peralta, on the daytime soap opera Guiding Light
 Ava, a humanoid robot in the film Ex Machina
 Ava Paige, in the book and film series The Maze Runner
 Ava the Sunset Fairy, in the book series Rainbow Magic

Companies and organizations
 Aargau Verkehr AG, a transportation company based in Aargau, Switzerland.
 Academy of Vocal Arts, a Philadelphia music conservatory
 Adult Film Association of America or Adult Video Association, an American trade association for the adult sex film industry
 Agri-Food and Veterinary Authority of Singapore, a now-defunct statutory board in the Singapore government
 Amazon Valley Academy
 American Vecturist Association, an organization of transportation token collectors in the United States and Canada
 Arab Volleyball Association, a volleyball association
 Association for Volunteer Administration
 Association of Veterinary Anaesthetists, a group of people who promote the use and study of anaesthetics in veterinary medicine
 Australian Veterinary Association
 AVA Radio Company, Polish electronics firm

Media and entertainment
 Ava (2017 French film)
 Ava (2017 Iranian film)
 Ava (2020 film), an American action thriller film
 AVA (TV channel), a Finnish television channel owned by MTV3
 "Ava" (Brooklyn Nine-Nine), a television episode
 AVA Recordings, a label founded by Andy Moor which focuses on melodic electronic music
 Angels & Airwaves, an American alternative rock/space rock band
 A Vacant Affair, a Singaporean metalcore band
 Alliance of Valiant Arms, a 2007 computer game
 Animator vs. Animation, a web series produced by Alan Becker

Other uses
 Hurricane Ava (disambiguation), five tropical cyclones in the Eastern Pacific Ocean
 SS Ava (1855), a P&O steamship wrecked off Ceylon in 1858
 ava, the language code for the Avar language
 Ava, a ceremonial ritual and beverage of the Samoa Islands
 Activity vector analysis (AVA), a personality test
 American Viticultural Area, a designated wine grape-growing region in the United States
 Anthrax Vaccine Adsorbed, trade name BioThrax, an American anthrax vaccine
 Aortic valve area
 Auditory verbal agnosia, the inability to comprehend speech

See also